Alexey Sivokon (born 7 September 1973) is a Kazakhstani powerlifting competitor who won seven world titles between 1993 and 2001. He was six times the strongest on Asian Championships. Two times won World Games. He won seven times Bench Press World Championships.

References

1973 births
Kazakhstani powerlifters
Living people
People from Temirtau
World Games gold medalists
Competitors at the 1997 World Games
Competitors at the 2001 World Games